This is a list of the non-Muslim interactors with Muslims during Muhammad's era. In Islam, the Ṣaḥābah ( "companions") were the companions of the Islamic prophet Muhammad. This form is plural; the singular is Ṣaḥābi (fem. Ṣaḥabiyyah). A list of the best-known companions can be found at List of companions of Muhammad

Arabian Peninsula
Abu 'Afak – Jewish poet
Asma bint Marwan – female poet who lived in Hijāz
Sallam ibn Abu al-Huqayq
Musaylimah – known as "the Liar", self-proclaimed prophet

Mecca
Akhnas ibn Shariq — Surah Al-Humaza
Hisham ibn al-Mughirah — unclear if he became a sahaba
Abu Lahab ibn abd al-Muttalib — often abbreviated as Abu Lahab
Amr ibn Hishām — also known as Abu Jahl, killed in the Battle of Badr
Al-Aas — one of the leaders of the Quraish, killed in the Battle of Badr
Mughira ibn Abd-Allah — father of Walid ibn Mughira and one of the leaders of the Quraish
Nawfal ibn Khuwaylid — one of the leaders of the Quraish, killed in the battle of Badr
Siba'a ibn Abd-al-Uzza — Umm Anmaar's brother
Ubayd-Allah ibn Jahsh — converted to Christianity
Ubay ibn Khalaf — famously mocked the prophet by blowing the dust of dried bones in his face
Umayah ibn Khalaf — head of the Bani Lou'ai, master and torturer of Bilal ibn Ribah
Umm Anmaar — the woman that bought Khabbab ibn al-Aratt
Umm Jamil — Abu Lahab's wife

Utbah ibn Rabi'ah — one of the leaders of the Quraish, killed in the battle of Badr
Uqba ibn Abu Mu'ayt 

Walid ibn al-Mughirah  — father of Khalid ibn al-Walid 
Walid ibn Utbah  — the champion of Quraish, killed by Ali ibn Abu Talib in the battle of Badr
Amr ibn Abd al-Wud — killed by Ali in the battle of the trench.

Medina
Abd-Allah ibn Ubayy

Jewish

(from Banu Nadir, Banu Qurayza, Banu al-Harith and Khaybar) 

Kinana ibn Abu al-Huqayq
Sallam ibn Abu al-Huqayq
Huyayy ibn Akhtab 
Ka'b ibn al-Ashraf 
Usayr ibn Zarim
Kinana ibn al-Rabi
Sallam ibn Mishkam
Ka'b ibn Asad
Barra binte Samawal 
Azzal ibn Samaw'al
Abu al-Rafi ibn Abu al-Huqayq 
Al-Rabi ibn Abu al-Huqayq 
Sallam ibn al-Rabi'
Rabi ibn al-Rabi'
Harith ibn al-Harith ibn Habib
al-Harith ibn al-Harith ibn al-Harith ibn Habib
Marhab ibn al-Harith ibn al-Harith ibn Habib
Yasir ibn al-Harith ibn al-Harith ibn Habib
Zeynab bint Al-Harith ibn al-Harith ibn Habib
Kharija ibn Sallam ibn Mishkam
Layla bint Tha'labah ibn Habib

Najran
The Najran Christians that participated in the Mubahela

Africa

Abyssinia
In pre-Islamic Abyssinia, the Abyssinian merchants traded with their Arabic counterparts. After Muhammad declared to be the last Prophet of God, the Pagan Arabs persecuted the Muslims. Many Muslim families migrated to Abyssinia. And the local Abyssinians converted to Islam, before Muhammad declared that the new faith was completed.

Ashama ibn Abjar The Negus (Emperor) of Abyssinia – spoke with the Muslims who made the Migration to Abyssinia.

Egypt
Muqawqis - ruler of Egypt

Other countries
Harith Gassani – Governor of Syria
Heraclius – Byzantine Emperor, 610 to 641
Khosrau II of Persia – king of Persia, 590 to 628
al-Mundhir bin Sawa – ruler of Bahrain

See also
Arabian tribes that interacted with Muhammad
Jewish tribes of Arabia
Sahaba
Salaf
Emperor Gaozong of Tang - built China's first mosque and spoke with an envoy headed by Sa`ad ibn Abi Waqqas

References

Muhammad and other religions